Edward Terry (1590–1660) was an English chaplain at the English embassy to the Great Mogul and an author who wrote about the Mogul empire and South Asian cuisine.

History
In 1616, the British East India Company appointed Terry as one of its fleet chaplains for a trip to India.  While en route in the Indian Ocean,  the fleet engaged and destroyed a Portuguese carrack. Terry later described this battle in his work, A Voyage to East-India.

When Terry arrived in India, Sir Thomas Row, the English ambassador, asked Terry to become the new chaplain for the English embassy. Terry's predecessor had just recently died. Terry spent the next two and half years with Row as they followed the Mogul court around what is today Gujarat, India and Bihar, India.

After returning to England, Terry served as rector of the Church at Great Greenford, in Middlesex, England until his death in 1660.

Published work
Terry wrote A Voyage to East-India as an expanded version of a manuscript that was first published in Purchas his Pilgrimes in 1625.

What distinguished Voyage was Terry's detailed descriptions of the different ethnic groups in the region, including their cultures, languages, and religious beliefs.  Terry was one of the first writers to describe Indian-style vegetarianism to Early Modern England.  Given that Terry only visited two regions of the Indian Subcontinent, much of his commentary was probably based on other research.

Voyage was a popular work in England that was later translated into other languages.  It was included in the Travels of Pietro della Valle.

References

Bibliography

 (William Henry, Prince of Orange later reigned as William III of England)

 (For the title word, see Eleutheria)

External links

1590 births
1660 deaths
17th-century English Anglican priests
English travel writers